P. Nagalingam was an Indian politician and former Member of the Legislative Assembly of Tamil Nadu. He was elected to the Tamil Nadu legislative assembly from Ponneri constituency as a Dravida Munnetra Kazhagam candidate in 1967, and 1971 elections.

References 

Dravida Munnetra Kazhagam politicians
Living people
Year of birth missing (living people)
Tamil Nadu MLAs 1971–1976